Kalypso (minor planet designation: 53 Kalypso) is a large and very dark main belt asteroid that was discovered by German astronomer Robert Luther on April 4, 1858, at Düsseldorf. It is named after Calypso, a sea nymph in Greek mythology, a name it shares with Calypso, a moon of Saturn.

The orbit of 53 Kalypso places it in a mean motion resonance with the planets Jupiter and Saturn. The computed Lyapunov time for this asteroid is 19,000 years, indicating that it occupies a chaotic orbit that will change randomly over time because of gravitational perturbations of the planets.

Photometric observations of this asteroid during 2005–06 gave a light curve with a period of 18.075 ± 0.005 hours and a brightness variation of 0.14 in magnitude. In 2009, a photometric study from a different viewing angle was performed at the Organ Mesa Observatory in Las Cruces, New Mexico, yielding a rotation period of 9.036 ± 0.001 with a brightness variation of 0.14 ± 0.02 magnitude. This is exactly half of the 2005–06 result. The author of the earlier study used additional data observation that favored the 9.036 hour period. The discrepancy was deemed a consequence of viewing the asteroid from different longitudes.

Kalypso has been studied by radar.

References

External links 
 
 

Background asteroids
Kalypso
Kalypso
XC-type asteroids (Tholen)
18580404
Calypso (mythology)